Roger Michael Watkins (September 17, 1948 – March 6, 2007) was an American filmmaker best known for the 1970s grindhouse movie Last House on Dead End Street. He also directed several adult films, working with pornographic actors such as Jamie Gillis, Vanessa del Rio, and Samantha Fox.

The Internet Movie Database lists a number of Watkins' aliases (see the information box at right), most of which seem to have been used in Last House on Dead End Street to conceal the fact that he worked in several capacities on that film (director, actor, writer, editor, and producer).

Biography
Watkins was born in Binghamton, New York. He graduated from Oneonta State College in 1971 with a Bachelor's degree in English Literature. While studying for his degree he visited England and served as an apprentice for film director Freddie Francis. On returning to the U.S. he continued his apprenticeship, working for Otto Preminger and Nicholas Ray. He married Marcia Elliott in 1972, with whom he fathered two daughters.

Watkins began his career in adult film by writing the screenplay for Mystique (1979) which was directed by Roberta Findlay and for which he was uncredited. The following year he began writing and directing adult feature films under the pseudonym Richard Mahler, which he took from combining the names of two of his favorite composers, Richard Wagner and Gustav Mahler. His best known adult films (Her Name Was Lisa (1979), Midnight Heat (1983), Corruption (1983), and American Babylon (1985) are considered by many to be more cult films or arthouse films than pornography due to their multi layered narratives that are downbeat in tone, containing elements of avant-garde, horror and satire.

Watkins died at his home in Apalachin, New York on March 6, 2007, aged 58.

Partial filmography

References

External links 

 Richard Mahler at the Internet Adult Film Database
 

1948 births
2007 deaths
American film directors
American pornographic film directors
State University of New York at Oneonta alumni